Abdur Rehman Dyer (15 August 1936 – 13 July 2021) was a Pakistani industrialist, cricket patron and cricketer. He played eighteen first-class cricket matches for Karachi between 1955/56 and 1969/70.

Born on 15 August 1936 in Ahmedabad, Gujarat, British India, his family moved to West Pakistan after independence.

References

1936 births
2021 deaths
Pakistani cricketers
Karachi cricketers
Pakistani industrialists
Pakistani people of Gujarati descent
People from Karachi
People from Ahmedabad